John Evert Nyberg (28 February 1925 – 17 August 2000) was a Swedish long-distance runner who won a bronze medal in the 5000 m event at the 1946 European Championships. He competed in the 5000 m at the 1948 Summer Olympics and in the marathon at the 1956 and 1960 Summer Olympics with the best result of eighth place in 1956. He won the Košice Peace Marathon in 1955.

Nyberg won national titles in the 5000 m (1946 and 1956), 10000 m (1955), 25000 m (1955–57 and 1960), 30000 m (1961 and 1962), marathon (1955, 1957, 1962 and 1963) and cross country (1950, 1955 and 1957).

References

1925 births
2000 deaths
Swedish male long-distance runners
Olympic athletes of Sweden
Athletes (track and field) at the 1948 Summer Olympics
Athletes (track and field) at the 1956 Summer Olympics
Athletes (track and field) at the 1960 Summer Olympics
European Athletics Championships medalists
Athletes from Gothenburg